Clouston's hidrotic ectodermal dysplasia  is a medical condition caused by mutations in a connexin gene, GJB6 or connexin-30, characterized by scalp hair that is wiry, brittle, and pale, often associated with patchy alopecia.

Presentation
Hidrotic ectodermal dysplasia 2, or Clouston syndrome (referred to as HED2 throughout this entry) is characterized by partial or total alopecia, dystrophy of the nails, hyperpigmentation of the skin (especially over the joints), and clubbing of the fingers. Sparse scalp hair and dysplastic nails are seen early in life. In infancy, scalp hair is wiry, brittle, patchy, and pale; progressive hair loss may lead to total alopecia by puberty. The nails may be milky white in early childhood; they gradually become dystrophic, thick, and distally separated from the nail bed. Palmoplantar keratoderma may develop during childhood and increases in severity with age. The clinical manifestations are highly variable even within the same family.

Genetics
HED2 is inherited in an autosomal dominant manner. Most individuals with HED2 have an affected parent; de novo gene mutations have also been reported. Offspring of affected individuals have a 50% chance of inheriting the mutation and being affected.

Diagnosis
HED2 is suspected after infancy on the basis of physical features in most affected individuals. GJB6 is the only gene known to be associated with HED2. Targeted mutation analysis for the four most common GJB6 mutations is available on a clinical basis and detects mutations in approximately 100% of affected individuals. Sequence analysis is also available on a clinical basis for those in whom none of the four known mutations is identified.

Screening
Prenatal testing for pregnancies at increased risk is possible if the disease-causing mutation in an affected family member is known; however, requests for prenatal testing for conditions such as HED2 are not common.

Treatment
Treatment of manifestations: special hair care products to help manage dry and sparse hair; wigs; artificial nails; emollients to relieve palmoplantar hyperkeratosis.

See also
 Palmoplantar keratoderma
 List of cutaneous conditions
 List of cutaneous neoplasms associated with systemic syndromes

References

Further reading
  GeneReviews/NCBI/NIH/UW entry on Hidrotic Ectodermal Dysplasia 2
  OMIM entries on Hidrotic Ectodermal Dysplasia 2

Palmoplantar keratodermas
Genodermatoses
Rare diseases